Ommatobotys is a genus of moths of the family Crambidae.

Species
Ommatobotys aldabralis (Viette, 1958)
Ommatobotys ommatalis (Hampson, 1912)

References

Spilomelinae
Crambidae genera
Taxa named by Eugene G. Munroe